The 2020 Ghanaian general election was held on 7 December 2020 to elect Members of Parliament (MPs) to the 8th Parliament of the Fourth Republic. The Speaker is not an elected member of parliament though he/she is qualified to stand for election as such. There are a total of 275 constituencies in Ghana. The 8th Parliament will start sitting on 7 January 2021 to elect a Speaker and Deputy Speakers as well as for the administration of oaths to the Speaker and Members of Parliament.

Current composition

List of MPs elected in the general election
Some of the MPs who had been in parliament for many years decided not to stand again in the 2020 election. There were 11 in this category including Alban Bagbin, MP for Nadowli West constituency and previously Nadowli North since 2001. As many as 40 NPP MPs lost their primaries while 9 suffered the same fate in the NDC.



Notes
Non returning members (MPs) - 111 MPs in all will not return to Parliament when it opens on 7 January 2021 for varied reasons. For the NPP, 4 MPs decided to retire from Parliament while 41 lost in the NPP primaries. In the election itself, a further 33 lost their seats meaning 78 NPP MPs out of 169 from the previous parliament will not be present. For the NDC, 7 MPs chose to retire and 8 lost the primaries. The election resulted in another 18 losing their seats so 33 NDC MPs in all from the 7th Parliament will be absent. Those from the NPP who retired were Anthony Akoto Osei, MP for Tafo Pankrono, Kwabena Appiah-Pinkrah, MP for Akrofuom, Ziblim Iddi MP for Gushegu and Shirley Ayorkor Botchwey MP for Anyaa Sowutuom. The 7 from the NDC who retired were Alban Bagbin, MP for Nadowli, Richard Quashigah, MP for Keta, Inusah Fuseini, Tamale Central, Bernice Adiku Heloo, Hohoe, Magnus Kofi Amoatey, Yilo Krobo, Clement Kofi Humado, Anlo and Fiifi Kwetey for Ketu South. 
Fomena - In October 2020, Andrew Asiamah Amoako the incumbent MP, who was one of the 41 to lose the NPP primaries opted to stand as an independent candidate. This led to him being sacked by the party as by registering as an independent candidate, the party no more recognised him as a member. The NPP then wrote to the Speaker of Parliament stating that he was no longer a member of the party and could not take his seat in parliament. The Speaker, Mike Oquaye subsequently declared the Fomena seat vacant in line with Article 97(1)(g) of the constitution. President Nana Akufo-Addo during the election campaign suggested to the people of Fomena that they would not benefit from having an independent MP and tried to woo him back. It is claimed Akufo-Addo cited Amoako's alleged disrespect for him as the reason why he could not work with him. Amoako however won his seat as an independent.
Mfantseman - Following the murder of the incumbent MP by armed robbers during the election campaign, the seat was declared vacant due to there being less than three months before the election. Ophelia Hayford, widow of Ekow Hayford contested in place of her husband and won the seat.
Assin North - On 13 April 2022, the Supreme Court of Ghana ruled by 5-2 majority decision that James Gyakye Quayson could not continue to sit in the house as MP for Assin North. This was after he had appealed a Cape Coast High Court ruling had nullified his election and ordered a by-election following a petition.
 Four first time MPs were alleged to have continued receiving salaries from their previous jobs although they had taken their seats in parliament. Three of them, Stephen Jalulah of Pru West,  Alhassan Iddi for Salaga North, Alexander Gyan of Kintampo South have apparently returned the excess payments while Sylvester Tetteh of Bortianor-Ngleshie-Amanfro has denied that he has collected any double salary.

See also
2020 Ghanaian general election
Parliament of Ghana
List of general elections in Ghana
List of female members of the Eighth Parliament of the Fourth Republic of Ghana

References

External links and sources
List of new members entering parliament - GhanaWeb
List of MPs not returning after December 2020 election - GhanaWeb

2020
Ghana
Ghanaian general election MPs
General election